The Norfolk Public Schools, also known as Norfolk City Public Schools, are the school division responsible for public education in the United States city of Norfolk, Virginia.

List of schools

See also 
 Broussard v. School Board of Norfolk

References

External links
 Norfolk Public Schools website

School divisions in Virginia
Education in Norfolk, Virginia